Rosita Sokou (Zoi Maria (Rozita) Sokou; 9 September 1923 – 14 December 2021) was a Greek journalist, author, playwright and translator. Sokou was one of the first women journalists in Greece and started her career as a film critic in 1946. She moved to Rome, Italy after marrying an Italian journalist and author, Manlio Maradei. Having difficulty adjusting to life and career in Italy, she moved back to Greece with her daughter to resume her work. From 1977–1983 she became a celebrity as part of a panel in the TV Show Na I Efkeria. In 1992–1993 she went on to host her own TV show at New Channel called Visitors at Night. She translated work for many authors. She was also very involved with theatre and wrote plays, adaptations and more. She also wrote books, and won awards from the French government and from Greece for her Greek journalism.

Early life and studies
Her father, Georgios Sokos, was a journalist, editor and playwright from Aitoliko who died at the age of 44, just before World War II. Her mother Titika Michailidou came from Smyrna. Sokou was born in Plaka, Athens, Greece, on 9 September 1923, growing up in Psychiko. Her maternal grandfather, Fotis Michailidis, was a cinema and theatre fan and made her see all films and plays available every week, and Rosita started writing reviews of what she saw while in high school. Fotis Michailidis was also the co-founder of Greek pasta manufacturer MISKO in 1927. Rosita Sokou graduated from the Arsakeio School in Psychiko. During the war and the Axis occupation she perfected her French at the Institut Français under Roger Milliex and English at the British Council (Cambridge Diploma of English Studies). She attended the State School of Fine Arts which she left to study with  painter Yannis Tsarouchis – who later discouraged her from becoming a painter – and also attended the Vassilis Rotas Drama School for the purpose of general knowledge, while working from a tender age as a translator and a foreign language teacher. After the end of the Axis occupation and the Civil War, in 1947, she attended a summer course on 20th century literature at Lady Margaret Hall College of the University of Oxford.

Film critic
One of the first women journalists in Greece, she started her career as a film critic. She was part of a group of critics who were known for literary comparisons. From 1946 she was  writing in newspapers such as Vradini, Kathimerini, Mesimvrini,  Ethnos, Acropolis, Apoghevmatini and the English-language Athens News, as well as for numerous magazines and regularly attended film festivals in Cannes, Venice, Berlin, Moscow, Taormina, Houston (Texas), Thessaloniki, as well as the “Festival dei Due Mondi” in Spoleto, Italy. From the 70s, she expanded to theatre criticism and various other columns.

After her marriage to Italian journalist and author Manlio Maradei, she lived in Rome, Italy, from 1957 to 1961, but had difficulties with the life of a housewife. Her attempts to start a new career in Italian newspapers and magazines, writing in the Italian language, and to adapt to the bourgeois mentality of Italian society of the times were only moderately successful; she then decided to come back to live in Greece with her daughter, resuming her job in "Kathimerini" (morning paper) as well as the new "Mesimvrini" (evening paper) and "Eikones" (weekly magazine) of editor Eleni Vlachos (sometimes also spelled Vlakhos).

In 1967, after the onset of the military dictatorship,  Eleni Vlachou closed her media, in protest against the suppressed freedom of the press, and flew to London where she stayed for the whole duration of the dictatorship. Rosita was left jobless, and with a small child to provide for. Nevertheless, she was one of the only two people (the other one was Freddie Germanos) who refused to sue Vlachou and ask for damages asking for a financial compensation – for this she faced the disciplinary board of the Journalists' Union and was threatened to be expelled from the Union. She held fast: accepting to sign the lawsuit meant to recognize that Vlachou's claim (that it was impossible to have press worthy of its name in Greece) was unsubstantial. These were difficult years, in which she worked editing encyclopaedias, translating, collaborating with magazines and finally ended up, in 1969, working for the Botsis newspapers, Acropolis and (from 1970) Apoghevmatini. There, she expanded to other subjects, writing theatre, ballet and TV reviews. On the next decade, after becoming a well-known TV persona, she had her own full page where, every Sunday, she wrote on whatever stuck her fancy.
At the end of the 7-year dictatorship, Eleni Vlachou came back to Greece and opened "Kathimerini" again, and Rosita collaborated sporadically under the pseudonym of Irene Stavrou until 1987 when the newspaper was sold to the Koskotas group. Apogevmatini eventually turned her out in 2005, after 35 years, as part of the newspaper's policy to prefer young low-paid journalists.

Television
During the period 1977–1983 she became a celebrity as part of the panel in the TV show "Na I Efkeria" ("Here's your chance", a Greek version of "Opportunity knocks"). These were the early days of TV, and the audience response was unprecedented. In 1992–93 she hosted her own TV show at New Channel, "Visitors at Night". She welcomed the guests in her own living room, and chatted with them in an informal way, something unprecedented in the history of Greek TV.

Translations
She translated many authors – Aldous Huxley, Ingmar Bergman, Isaac Asimov and Stanisław Lem – reflecting her own tastes and interests, as well as comics such as the "Corto Maltese" series by Hugo Pratt. She translated, edited and updated the two-volume "Cinema", an encyclopedia by Georges Charensol, and was for many years co-responsible for the foreign language edition of the Athens Festival programme.

Theatre – adaptations and translations
Since 1974 she started her deeper involvement with the theatre, writing the play The Portrait of Dorian Gray (based on Oscar Wilde's novella), and adapting Georg Büchner's Lenz for Dimitri Potamitis' Theatre of Research. Later on, she translated Sam Shepard’s Shock and Edward Albee’s Sea View for Yorgos Messalas' company. Together with her daughter, she translated Manjula Padmanabhan’s Harvest which was awarded 1st prize at the Onassis International Theatre Competition in 1998 and Jean Anouilh’s Jesabel for Jenny Roussea’s troupe in 1999.

Original writings
She was spurred to write a book by her chance encounter and subsequent decade-long friendship with Rudolf Nureyev. It started with an impassioned account of their meeting and a biography, in the book Nureyev (1982).
The life of the late Greek ballet dancer Anastassios Vitoros inspired the little book Anastassios (1985).
The book on Nureyev was followed, almost ten years later, by the play Quai Voltaire (1991) inspired by her experiences in the ballet scene – Quai Voltaire being the address of Nureyev's Paris flat.

After the artist's death, Rosita, with the help of her daughter, greatly expanded that first work in Nureyev – as I knew him (2003), which not only updated the contents of the first book, but also included Rosita's day-by day diaries when she travelled to London, Paris and Vienna for the rehearsals and first production of his main works there: a fascinating behind-the scenes glimpse of the people -artists and technicians- responsible for these grand performances.  
In 2005 she wrote "Mario and I", a biography of Greek singer Mario Frangoulis and account of her long-time friendship with him. It was published by Kastaniotis editions.

In 2018 she published her 2-volume autobiography, titled "Rosita's Century" (O aionas tis Rositas), ranging from her grandparents' eloping in Smyrna to the present day. Volume 1 covers the first half of the 20th century, roughly until her marriage and moving to Italy and volume 2 the years of her marriage, motherhood, return to Greece and most of her career as a journalist, including the many people, famous or not famous, she met in her long life.

The book was compiled from chapters and pages written by her in the past 20 years or so, integrated with info from her articles and interviews given, the whole thing checked and edited by her daughter Irene Maradei, who also wrote the preface. A revised and expanded edition is planned for the end of 2021.

Teaching
In the years before her death, she taught Theatrical History at the "Melissa" Drama School created by Elda Panopoulou and at the Piraeus Union Drama School. Not so much a formal history, the one found in books, as her own behind-the-scenes experiences of Greek theatre and its artists, with whom she has lived side by side for the better part of a century.

Awards
She has been given the medal "Chevalier de l' Ordre des Arts et des Lettres" by the French government (1986), and awarded by the Botsis Foundation (1988) for her contribution to Greek journalism.

Personal life and death
Sokou died from COVID-19 in Athens on 14 December 2021, at the age of 98.

Works

Articles
Newspapers
 Oi kairoi (1948–50)
 Anexartisia (1949)
 Vradini (1949–1955)
 Athens News (1952–1960)
 Kathimerini (1953–1957 and 1960–1967, 1974–1987)
 Mesimvrini (1961–1965)
 Acropolis (1969-
 Apoghevmatini (1970–2005)
 Ethnos tis Kyriakis
 Kosmos tou ependyti

Magazines
 Hollywood (1946)
 Eikones (1953–1957 and 1961–1967)
 Ekloghi  (1955–1961)
 Epikaira (1967)
 Proto (1967–68)
 Paidi kai Neoi goneis
 Tilerama (1984–2005)

TV and radio shows
Radio
 "Lithoi kai keramoi" – with Kostas Ferris
 "Episkeptes tis nichtas" – with various guests

TV
 "Na i efkairia" (Here is your chance)  (1977–1983) member of the panel
 "Oneira sto fos : Na i efkairia – new version" 1997 at Channel 5
 "Oi episkeptes tis nychtas" (The night visitors) (1992–1993) New Channel

Films
 Pros tin eleftheria (by Haris Papadopoulos) 1996

Translations
Books and comics
 Bergman: The trilogy of silence (3 screenplays) Ed. Galaxias
 Bergman: Three screenplays “Wild strawberries”, “The seventh seal” Ed. Galaxias, reprinted by ed. Hermias, 
 Aldous Huxley: The genius and the goddess
 Stanislaw Lem: Cyberiad (1979) ed. Kaktos
 Stanislaw Lem: Solaris (1961) ed. Kastaniotis
 Isaac Asimov: I, robot ed. Galaxias
 Fantastika diighimata (Anthology of Science Fiction short stories) Ed. Galaxias, 1961
 Chanel la solitaire Ed. Galaxias
 Charensol: Histoire du cinema  Ed. Papyros-Larousse
 Corto Maltese (many titles) for Mammouth Comics editions

Theatre
 Shock – by Sam Shepard  1995
 Sea View – by Edward Albee 1996
 Harvest – by Manjula Padmanabhan (with I. Maradei) – 1988
 Jesabel – by Jean Anouilh (with I. Maradei)- 1999

Theatrical adaptions
 Lenz, from the work of Georg Büchner
 The Portrait of Dorian Gray – from Oscar Wilde's novella 1977, for Dimitri Potamitis, also produced in 2000 with Stratos Tzortzoglou in the leading role

Original writings
 The encephalopod – S.F. short story, first published in “Italia domani” magazine (Rome, 1960) and, in Greek, in the “Ekloghi” magazine #183 (19-6-1960)
 Nureyev – about her first meeting with the famous dancer/choreographer Ed. Kaktos, Athens, 1982
 Anastassios – a profile of the late ballet dancer Anastasios Vitoros Ed. Kaktos, Athens, 1985
 Nureyev – as I knew him – expanded version, a full biography, with the collaboration of Irene Maradei Ed. Kaktos, Athens, 2003 
 Quai Voltaire – theatrical play Ed. Hatzinikoli, Athens, 1990–91
 Mario and I, about singer Mario Frangoulis Ed. Kastaniotis, December 2005 
 Rosita's Century, a 2-volume autobiography edited by her daughter Irene Maradei. Ed. Odos Panos, November 2018

References

External links
 Bibliography

1923 births
2021 deaths
Deaths from the COVID-19 pandemic in Greece
Mass media people from Athens
Greek film critics
Greek biographers
Greek women journalists
Greek translators
Greek women dramatists and playwrights
Translators from English
Translators to Greek
Women film critics
Women biographers
Journalists from Athens
Greek expatriates in Italy
Alumni of Lady Margaret Hall, Oxford